Francisco Pacheco may refer to:

 Francisco Pacheco (1564–1644), Spanish painter
 Francisco Pacheco (politician), Indian politician
 Francisco Pacheco (singer) (born 1955), Venezuelan folk singer and drummer
 Francisco Pérez Pacheco (1790–1860), Californio ranchero